Admiral Edmund Charles Drummond (4 August 1841 – 6 May 1911) was a Royal Navy officer who went on to be Commander-in-Chief, East Indies Station.

Naval career
Born the son of Edmund Drummond, a career civil servant in British India, Drummond joined the Royal Navy in 1855. In 1867 he served as Flag Lieutenant to Admiral Sir Hastings Yelverton. Promoted to captain in 1877, he took command of HMS Tenedos in 1884. Then, promoted to rear admiral on 26 March 1892, he was made Commander-in-Chief, East Indies Station in 1895; he retired in 1903.

He lived at Halesworth in Suffolk.

Family
In 1872 he married Dora Naylor; they had one son and one daughter.

References

1841 births
1911 deaths
Royal Navy admirals